Phaeomolis brunnescens is a moth of the family Erebidae first described by Walter Rothschild in 1909. It is found in Panama, Brazil and Bolivia.

Subspecies
Phaeomolis brunnescens brunnescens (Brazil)
Phaeomolis brunnescens unicolor (Rothschild, 1909) (Bolivia)

References

Phaegopterina
Arctiinae of South America
Moths described in 1909